The 1922 North Carolina State Wolfpack football team was an American football team that represented the NC State Wolfpack of North Carolina State University during the 1922 college football season. In its third season under head coach Harry Hartsell, the team compiled a 4–6 record.

Schedule

References

NC State
NC State Wolfpack football seasons
NC State Wolfpack football